The Indian Ocean is home to many literary texts, from Greco-Roman times to One Thousand and One Nights, the matrix of many narratives, which portrays Sinbad the Merchant through a fantastic and popular twist of the mind, and which is based on real details of navigation in this first ocean of globalisation. Combining Indian and Chinese literatures, among the oldest on the planet, this can be characterized as the most fictionalized ocean, having been the backbone of many tales, novels and poetic work.

This was further enhanced when Bartholomew Diaz rounded the Cape of Good Hope in 1488, paving the way for Vasco da Gama, who reached Malindi, before being guided to Calicut, the desired port of spices, by a mualim or regional pilot. The Portuguese poet Camoens then wrote his famous Luciads.

Mark Twain sojourned there. So did Bernardin de Saint Pierre, who invented the naturalist novel with Paul et Virginie, an idyllic and tragic novel under the tropics, in Mauritius. Charles Baudelaire also carried his spleen there, experimenting the correspondences and falling in love with Creole and Indian ladies, as expressed in his poems "La dame créole" and "A une malabaraise". In Réunion, Rouget Leconte de Lisle is foremost, with symbolist poetry.

Many more poets went to the Mascarene islands, like Paul-Jean Toulet.

Colonial era

In the colonial era, writers like Rabemananjara and Rabearivelo took French to new horizons, combining their original languages and cultures with the colonists' idiom. In Réunion, Marius and Ary Leblond developed the colonial novel, and in Mauritius, Clément Charoux and Léoville L'Homme expressed the contradictions of cultures and colours in a colonial environment.

Preceding the independence period, Mauritian writers like Marcel Cabon, Jean-Georges Prosper, Edouard Maunick, Robert Edward-Hart, René Noyau and Emmanuel Juste espoused négritude or more Mauritian themes.

Postcolonial era

In the 1970s, more "sociological" writers such Marie-Thérèse Humbert expressed the duality of multiculturalism.

Recent Mauritian writers include Ananda Devi, Natacha Appanah, Carl de Souza, Shenaz Patel, Barlen Pyamootoo and Khal Torabully.

See also

 Indian literature
 Chinese literature
 Malagasy literature
 Mauritian literature

References

Indian Ocean
Asian literature
African literature